Qoldarreh, also rendered as Qowldarreh, may refer to:
 Qoldarreh-ye Olya
 Qoldarreh-ye Sofla